Dead Moon was an American punk rock band active from 1987 to 2006, formed in Portland, Oregon.

History 
Fronted by the singer/guitarist Fred Cole, the band also included the bass guitarist Toody Cole and the drummer Andrew Loomis. Veterans of Portland's independent rock scene, Dead Moon combined dark and lovelorn themes with punk and country music influences into a stripped-down sound. Fred Cole engineered most of the band's recordings and mastered them on a mono recording lathe that was used for The Kingsmen's version of "Louie Louie". Their early records, such as In the Graveyard, were released on the Tombstone Records label, named for the musical equipment store the Coles operated at the time. Soon they caught the attention of the German label Music Maniac Records, and toured Europe successfully. Not until the mid-1990s did they tour the United States. Much of their following was in Europe.

A U.S. filmmaking team (Kate Fix and Jason Summers) produced a 2004 documentary, Unknown Passage: The Dead Moon Story, which played in independent theaters in the U.S. and New Zealand and at the Melbourne International Film Fest, and was released on DVD in fall 2006. Dead Moon has recorded for labels such as Empty Records, but most releases are on Music Maniac worldwide and Tombstone in the U.S.. The Tombstone label also provided cheap mastering and duplication for other bands, serving more as a co-operative than a promotional vehicle. Though the Coles were in their fifties, they showed no signs of slowing down on their 2004 release Dead Ahead, continuing to tour until 2006, when they released the Echoes of the Past compilation.

In December 2006, near the end of the Echoes of the Past tour, Dead Moon announced that they were breaking up. Their last gig was at the Vera club in Groningen on November 26, 2006.

Pearl Jam covered the song "It's O.K.", a song Fred wrote for his daughter Amanda; they often segue it with their song "Daughter" in live performances. Eddie Vedder of Pearl Jam has also covered "Diamonds in the Rough" and "Running Out of Time" with C-Average.

The Coles formed a new band called Pierced Arrows with the Portland punk musician Kelly Halliburton (whose father played in a band called Albatross with Fred Cole in 1972) of Severed Head of State, Defiance and formerly Murder Disco X. Pierced Arrows played their first show on May 18, 2007, at the Ash Street Saloon in Portland with the reformed Poison Idea. Loomis played drums for a band called The Shiny Things from Longview, Washington.

Andrew Loomis died on March 8, 2016, at the age of 54, from cancer. Fred Cole died on November 9, 2017, at the age of 69, also from cancer.

Equipment

Toody is known to play a late-1960s semi-hollow Vox teardrop bass guitar, due to its shorter-scale length and ease of use. She often plays through a V-4 Ampeg and Ampeg SVT bass amp head(s) and has also used an Ampeg 4x12 Speaker Cab live. In Europe, Toody uses a VHT 2-15 Speaker cab. Fred used a 50-watt Marshall Red Head and a Guild Thunderbird Guitar. He also had a 4x12 cab in the US and one in Europe. Fred and Toody both preferred Shure SM58 mics. Loomis mostly used a kick, snare, hat, floor tom and one ride cymbal.

Discography

Studio albums
In the Graveyard (1988)
Unknown Passage (1989)
Defiance (1990)
Stranded in the Mystery Zone (1991)
Strange Pray Tell (1992)
Crack in the System (1994)
Nervous Sooner Changes (1995)
Destination X (1999)
Trash & Burn (2001)
Dead Ahead (2004)

Compilation albums
Dead Moon Night (1990)
Thirteen Off My Hook (1990)
Echoes of the Past (2006)

Live albums
Live Evil (1991)
Hard Wired in Ljubljana (1997)
Alive In The Unknown (2002)
Live at The Casbah 10/21/2004 (2004)
Dead Moon, Live at Satyricon (2015)
What A Way To See The Old Girl Go (2017)

Singles
"Parchment Farm" (1988)
"Don't Burn the Fires" (1988)
"Black September" (1989)
"D.O.A." (1990)
"Over the Edge" (1991)
"Fire in the Western World" (1992)
"Day After Day" (1992)
"Clouds of Dawn" (1992)
"Dirty Noise" (1993)
"Ricochet" (1994)
"Sabotage" (2002)

References

Further reading

External links
Official website

Punk rock groups from Oregon
Garage rock groups from Oregon
Musical groups established in 1987
Musical groups from Portland, Oregon
1987 establishments in Oregon
2006 disestablishments in Oregon
Musical groups disestablished in 2006